This is a list of events held and scheduled by Pancrase, a mixed martial arts promotion based in Japan.

Scheduled events

Past events

See also 

 Pancrase
 List of Pancrase champions
 1993 in Pancrase

References 

Pancrase
Pancrase events